First Live Concert: The Real is the first live album of South Korean boy band Big Bang, released by YG Entertainment on February 8, 2007. The album was recorded during their debut concert on December 30, 2006 at the Olympic Gymnastics Arena in Seoul, in support of the group's first Korean studio album, Bigbang Vol.1.

Track listing

Charts

References

External links 
 Big Bang official site

BigBang (South Korean band) live albums
2007 live albums
YG Entertainment live albums
Korean-language live albums